Pelton is a village and electoral ward in County Durham, in England. The population of the village and ward taken at the 2011 census was 8,250. It is located about two miles to the northwest of Chester-le-Street. The village of West Pelton is located to the west; separated from it by a few villages between and closer to Stanley than to central Chester-le-Street. Pelton has a newly built community centre updated in 2012, one public house and a small range of convenience stores, including a CO OP, three general stores, a Post Office, chemist, doctors surgery, dentist, library, two parks and some take-away food outlets, and some hair salons. Local schools in the area include a primary school (Pelton Primary school). Pelton is served by public transport, with links to Stanley, Sunderland, Newcastle upon Tyne, Chester-le-Street and Consett with buses running up to every 30 minutes or so to 5 bus stops throughout the village. In local government they are governed by the Pelton Parish Council.

Most of the village sits within the River Tyne Catchment area, close to the tributary River Team which joins the Tyne in Dunston The remainder of the village sits within the River Wear catchment area, close to The Cong Burn, which joins the Wear in Chester-le-Street.

Notable people
 Alan White – drummer with Yes band, born 1949 - died 2022.
 Thomas Hepburn - English coal miner and trade union leader, born 1795 - died 1864.

References

Villages in County Durham